Pedro Cuatrecasas (born 27 September 1936) is an American biochemist and an Adjunct Professor of Pharmacology & Medicine at the University of California San Diego.

Birth and education 
Pedro Cuatrecasas was born in 1936 in Madrid, Spain. He completed his A.B. from Washington University in St. Louis in 1958. He completed his M.D. from Washington University School of Medicine in 1962.

Research 
Pedro Cuatrecasas is known for the invention and development of affinity chromatography, a process utilized within the Aethlon HemopurifierTM. He was involved in the discovery, development and marketing registration of more than forty medicines. Some of those medicines include: zidovudine (AZT, AIDS), acyclovir (Zovirax, anti-herpes), permethrin (Rid, head and body lice), bupropion (Wellbutrin, antidepressant), colfosceril palmitate (Exosurf, infant acute respiratory distress), remifentanil (Ultiva, analgesic/anesthetic), sumatriptan (Imigran, migraine), salmeterol (Serement, asthma), tacrine (Cognex, Alzheimers), gabapentin (Neurontin, epilepsy and neuropathic pain), troglitazone (Rezulin, diabetes), and atorvastatin (Lipitor, cholesterol lowering).

In 1987 Pedro Cuatrecasas won the Wolf Prize in Medicine in 1987 along with Meir Wilchek "for the invention and development of affinity chromatography and its applications to biomedical sciences."

References

External links 
 CV of Pedro Cuatrecasas
 Researchers Share Prize in Medicine
 The Wolf Prize in Medicine in 1987 (detail)

1936 births
Spanish emigrants to the United States
American biochemists
Spanish biochemists
Washington University School of Medicine alumni
University of California, San Diego alumni
Wolf Prize in Medicine laureates
Living people
Members of the United States National Academy of Sciences
Members of the National Academy of Medicine
Washington University in St. Louis alumni